The 1946 NCAA Golf Championship was the eighth annual NCAA-sanctioned golf tournament to determine the individual and team national champions of men's collegiate golf in the United States.

This year's tournament was held at the Springdale Golf Club in Princeton, New Jersey.

Stanford won the team title, five strokes ahead of second-place Michigan. Coached by Eddie Twiggs, this was the Stanford's fourth NCAA golf title. 

The individual championship was won by George Hamer of Georgia.

With the culmination of World War II, the field expanded from five to 18 teams.

Team results

Note: Top 10 only
DC = Defending champions

References

NCAA Men's Golf Championship
Golf in New Jersey
NCAA Golf Championship
NCAA Golf Championship
NCAA Golf Championship